Richard Heimberg (born December 21, 1950) is a researcher, psychotherapist, and current professor at Temple University.

Early life
Heimberg graduated magna cum laude from the University of Tennessee in 1972, earning a Bachelor of Science degree in psychology. He earned a Master of Science in 1974 and Doctor of Philosophy in 1977, both from Florida State University.

Career
Cognitive behaviour group therapy was founded on principles developed by Heimberg at the University of Albany's Centre for Stress and Anxiety Disorders. His focus lies on anxiety disorders, specifically social phobia. He has published more than 400 articles and books.

In 1983, he became the first researcher to receive National Institute of Mental Health (NIMH) funding to study psychosocial treatments for social phobia after the term first appeared in the third edition of the Diagnostic and Statistical Manual of Mental Disorders in 1980.

See also
Cognitive therapy

External links
Homepage at Temple University

1950 births
Living people
21st-century American psychologists
Cognitive therapy
Cognitive-behavioral psychotherapists
20th-century American psychologists